Neo Geo is a family of video game hardware that was developed by SNK. On the market from 1990 to 2004, the brand originated with the release of an arcade system, the Neo Geo Multi Video System (MVS) and its home console counterpart, the Neo Geo Advanced Entertainment System (AES). 

Both the MVS and AES were powerful for the time, and the Neo Geo MVS was successful with arcade operators worldwide. However, while the AES allows for fully authentic versions of games released for the MVS, the high price for both the AES console and its games prevented it from directly competing with its contemporaries, the Sega Genesis, Super NES, and TurboGrafx-16.

Years later, SNK released the Neo Geo CD, a more cost-effective console with games released on compact discs. The console was met with limited success, due in part to its slow CD-ROM drive. In an attempt to compete with increasingly popular 3D games, SNK released the Hyper Neo Geo 64 arcade system in 1997 as the successor to its aging MVS. The system did not fare well and only a few games were released for it. A planned home console based on the hardware was never released. SNK later extended the brand by releasing a handheld console, the Neo Geo Pocket, which was quickly succeeded by the Neo Geo Pocket Color. Soon after their release, however, SNK encountered various legal and financial issues resulting in a sale of the company and discontinuation of the handheld. Despite that, the original Neo Geo MVS and AES continued receiving new games under new ownership until officially being discontinued in 2004, ending the brand.

Regardless of the failure of later Neo Geo hardware, games for the original MVS and AES have been well received. The system spawned several long-running and critically acclaimed series, mostly 2D fighters, including Fatal Fury, Art of Fighting, Samurai Shodown, The Last Blade, World Heroes, and The King of Fighters, as well as popular games in other genres such as the Metal Slug, Twinkle Star Sprites and Baseball Stars series. In December 2012, SNK Playmore released a handheld console based on the original AES, the Neo Geo X. As of March 1997, the Neo Geo had sold 980,000 units worldwide. The Neo Geo Pocket Color also has been given praise for multiple innovations, and a very substantial library, despite its short life.

Home arcades and consoles

Neo Geo MVS and AES

SNK's first two products using the Neo Geo name are an arcade system called the Neo Geo Multi Video System (MVS) and a companion console called the Advanced Entertainment System (AES), both released in 1990. The MVS offers arcade operators the ability to put up to six different arcade games into a single cabinet, a key economic consideration for operators with limited floorspace. It comes in many different cabinets but basically consists of an add on board that can be linked to a standard JAMMA system.

The AES was the first video game console in the family. The hardware features comparatively colorful 2D graphics. The hardware was in part designed by Alpha Denshi (later ADK).

Initially, the home system was only available for rent to commercial establishments, such as hotel chains, bars and restaurants, and other venues. When customer response indicated that some gamers were willing to buy a US$650 console, SNK expanded sales and marketing into the home console market. The Neo Geo console was officially launched on 31 January 1990 in Osaka, Japan. The AES is identical to its arcade counterpart, the MVS, so arcade games released for the home market are nearly identical conversions.

Neo Geo CD

The Neo Geo CD, released in 1994, was initially an upgrade from the original AES. This console uses CDs instead of ROM cartridges like the AES. The unit's (approximately) 1X CD-ROM drive was slow, making loading times very long with the system loading up to 56 Mbits of data between loads. Neo Geo CD game prices were low at US$50, in contrast to Neo Geo AES game cartridges which cost as much as US$300. The system could also play Audio CDs. Three models were released, the original top loader model, a revised front loader, and the CDZ, which featured a faster CD drive and was only released in Japan. All three versions of the system have no region-lock.

The Neo Geo CD was bundled with a control pad instead of a joystick like the AES. However, the original AES joystick can be used with all 3 Neo Geo CD models instead of the included control pads.

Hyper Neo Geo 64
 

The Hyper Neo Geo 64 is SNK's second and final arcade system board in the Neo Geo family, released in 1997. The Hyper Neo Geo 64 was conceived as SNK's 3D debut into the fifth generation video game consoles. It provided the hardware basis for a home system that would replace their aging Neo Geo AES, one that SNK hoped would be capable of competing with fifth generation video game consoles. In 1999, the Hyper Neo Geo 64 was discontinued, with only seven games released for it in two years.

Future systems

In April 2019, SNK announced at a conference in Seoul that they plan to release a Neo Geo 2 console and later a Neo Geo 3. They plan for the Neo Geo 2 to be a semi open platform console, where they will be built in games, as well as additional games that can be purchased separately. These are planned to be spiritual successors to the original Neo Geo arcade and home systems.

Handhelds

 
The Neo Geo Pocket was SNK's first handheld console in the Neo Geo family. Featuring a monochrome display, it was originally released in late 1998 exclusively in the Japan and Hong Kong markets. Lower than expected sales resulted in its discontinuation in 1999, whereupon it was immediately succeeded by the Neo Geo Pocket Color, which had a color screen. This time it was also released in the North American and European markets. About two million units were sold worldwide. The system was discontinued in 2000 in Europe and North America but continued to sell in Japan until 2001.

Retro consoles
In December 2012, Tommo released the Neo Geo X handheld in North America and Europe, licensed by SNK Playmore. It is an open-source-based handheld like the Dingoo, but closed to emulate Neo Geo games, with 20 built-in games. Effective October 2, 2013, citing violations of the license agreement, SNK Playmore decided to terminate the license given to Tommo and ordered to immediately cease sales of the Neo Geo X Arcade Stick. SNK added that "decisive measures will be taken against all unapproved NEOGEO X products not subject to the License Agreement."

Neo Geo Mini 

On June 9, 2018, SNK announced the Neo Geo Mini, a miniature sized semi-portable arcade cabinet (loosely resembling the appearance of a Japanese Neo Geo MVS) which features 40 built-in SNK titles, and was released on July 24, 2018, in Japan to celebrate SNK's 40th anniversary. The games on the system are the AES home console versions with limited continues, however, the Neo Geo Mini features a save/load state system which allows players to save and load the game at any time to continue the game and has up to four save files per game. The Neo Geo Mini also can be connected to a TV via an HDMI cable, including a headphone jack and two ports for external Neo Geo Mini control pads based on the Neo Geo CD controllers, allowing it to have two players play on the system at once.

SNK also released an international version of the Neo Geo Mini, which was released outside Japan on October 15, 2018, and later in Japan on November 15, 2018. The international version contains the same features as the Japanese Neo Geo Mini but 14 out of the 40 titles are different (including all of the Metal Slug games) and a different interface. As such, both versions have 54 different SNK titles in total.

In December 2018, a limited edition Christmas themed Neo Geo Mini was released. A red Neo Geo Mini unit with two red control pads, power cable, an HDMI cable, two screen protectors, seven stickers and an anti slip cushion. This edition has 48 games, nine of which were previously unreleased on the other two versions, as well as a mixture of games from both the existing releases.

On June 27, 2019, a limited edition called "Samurai Shodown" was released, in three colors; white, red, and blue, with a black edition being released later on. This edition has 40 games, featuring all of the Samurai Shodown games, including three new games that have never been included in prior versions. These also included two controllers, a USB cable, an HDMI cable, an anti slip cushion and a collectable character card.

On July 19, 2019, SNK announced the discontinuation of the original Neo Geo Mini and the international version.

On September 30, 2019, a limited edition called "Samurai Spirits Kuroko" was released. This edition has 48 games. 40 of them are exactly the same as the previous "Samurai Shodown" and "Samurai Spirits" editions, and the other 8 were all available previously in other editions (no new games are included). This version was released exclusively for Japan. This edition also has a gold trim on the box, instead of a silver one present on the international "Samurai Shodown Kuroko" edition, which only has the same 40 games as the other Samurai Shodown editions. The other Samurai Spirits versions from Japan are also the same as the international versions with the same 40 games on each.

Neo Geo Arcade Stick Pro

In September 2019, SNK announced the release of the Neo Geo Arcade Stick Pro. Resembling a large white arcade stick complete with joystick and 8 buttons, it has 20 built-in games, with the possibility of future games being added to it later, as well as HDMI output for TVs. It can also be used on any of the Neo Geo Mini units via an included adapter and is also backwards compatible with the game pads released for the Mini.

The initial 20 in built games are all fighting games:
The King of Fighters '95
The King of Fighters '97
The King of Fighters '98
The King of Fighters '99
The King of Fighters 2000
The King of Fighters 2002
Samurai Shodown II
Samurai Shodown III
Samurai Shodown IV
Samurai Shodown V Special
Fatal Fury Special
Fatal Fury 3: Road to the Final Victory
Garou: Mark of the Wolves
Kizuna Encounter: Super Tag Battle
Ninja Master's
Art of Fighting
The Last Blade 2
World Heroes 2
World Heroes 2 Jet
World Heroes Perfect

Over the course of the year 2020, SNK planned to release updates to unlock more games to the Neo Geo Arcade Stick Pro, two additional games per month, bringing the total to 40 games. However, hackers have been able to expose what the titles are without having to wait until the end of the year to obtain all the games. The unlockable games were revealed to be:
Metal Slug
Metal Slug 2
Metal Slug 3
Metal Slug 4
Metal Slug 5
Metal Slug X
The Last Blade
Shock Troopers
Shock Troopers: 2nd Squad
Art of Fighting 3: The Path of the Warrior
Fatal Fury: King of Fighters
Fatal Fury 2
Real Bout Fatal Fury Special
Super Sidekicks
League Bowling
The Super Spy
Ninja Combat
Samurai Shodown
Savage Reign
Soccer Brawl

In November 2020, a special limited Christmas edition of the Neo Geo Arcade Stick Pro was released. The package includes a Neo Geo CD style control pad, a cover for the arcade stick, an arcade stick ball cover, a sticker sheet and a Neo Geo 30th anniversary artbook. The games included are the same 40 games as the standard edition, only all 40 of the games are all unlocked.

Neo Geo MVSX
In August 2020, the company Unico announced the Neo Geo MVSX, an arcade table top system capable of playing MVS and AES titles that are pre-installed on the system itself, with 2 player support with a 17-inch screen. It comes pre-loaded with 50 games; The King of Fighters 94-2003, Metal Slug 1–5 and X, Samurai Shodown 1–5 and 5 Special, all eight Fatal Fury series games including Garou: Mark of the Wolves, the Sengoku trilogy, all four World Heroes games, The Last Blade and The Last Blade 2, Savage Reign and its sequel Kizuna Encounter: Super Tag Battle, Shock Troopers, Football Frenzy, Super Sidekicks, Magician Lord, 3 Count Bout, Top Player's Golf, Baseball Stars Professional, Art of Fighting and Art of Fighting 3: The Path of the Warrior. Also available is a 32-inch stand to allow it to work as a free-standing unit resembling a vintage MVS cabinet. It also has a USB connector that can be used for future firmware updates. The machine itself and the 32-inch base were released in November 2020 in North America.

See also 
 List of Neo Geo games

Explanatory notes

References

External links
 Neo-Geo Museum: Official website featuring all releases.
 NeoGeoSoft.com: A complete software and artwork resource for the Neo Geo.
 Video of Neo Geo AVS hardware and features from FamicomDojo.TV

 
Video game consoles